Ulmus davidiana var. japonica, the Japanese elm, is one of the larger and more graceful Asiatic elms, endemic to much of continental northeast Asia and Japan, where it grows in swamp forest on young alluvial soils, although much of this habitat has now been lost to intensive rice cultivation.

Description
The size and shape of the Japanese elm is extremely variable, ranging from short and bearing a densely branched broad crown similar to the Wych elm to tall, single-stemmed, with narrow crown similar to the English elm. Augustine Henry described one of the latter outside Iwamigawa, Hokkaido, railway station as being 34 m tall, with a clean stem to a height of approximately 15 m. The Morton Arboretum, Illinois, distinguishes a cork-barked form from China, U. propinqua var. suberosa. Japanese elm is distinguished by the fawn colour of shoots at the end of their first season, the shoots often being roughened by minute tubercles or 'warts'. The young shoots often bear corky wings, similar to those of the European field elm U. minor, to which it is closely related.

The leaves are generally obovate, < 11 cm long, with a petiole about 10mm long.  Like many of the European field elms, var. japonica retains its green foliage well into the autumn, before a late display of deep yellow. Bean noted that the variety from western China, formerly known as U. wilsoniana, has 16 to 22 pairs of leaf-veins, while the eastern type tree has not more than 16. The perfect, apetalous wind-pollinated flowers emerge in early spring, before the leaves. The samara, <15 mm long, is obovate to orbicular, occasionally hairy over its entire surface but more often glabrous, the seed touching the notch, the inner margins of which are ciliate, the stigmas being slightly incurved. Trees grown from seed at Great Fontley in southern England first flowered aged 13 years. The species does not sucker from roots.

Pests and diseases
Natural populations of Japanese elm have a low to moderate resistance to Dutch elm disease. In trials in the Netherlands, susceptibility to disease was found to be commensurate with rate of growth, the more vigorous specimens exhibiting far more foliar damage after inoculation with the causal fungus. Careful selection in North America has produced a number of cultivars highly resistant to disease (see Hybrids, hybrid cultivars and cultivars below). The tree is resistant to the elm leaf beetle Xanthogaleruca luteola  but is moderately susceptible to elm yellows.

Cultivation
Japanese elm has been widely planted in northern Japan as a street tree. It was introduced to North America in 1890 as seed brought by William Smith Clark and planted at the University of Massachusetts. This was after years of his teaching from where later on Sapporo to the Arnold Arboretum, Massachusetts, whence two seedlings were donated to Kew Gardens, London, in 1897. The Späth nursery, Berlin, marketed Japanese elm in Europe from 1900, Kew obtaining a third specimen from them in that year. Specimens were supplied by Späth to the Royal Botanic Garden Edinburgh in 1903 as U. campestris japonica and may survive in Edinburgh, as it was the practice of the Garden to distribute trees about the city. A specimen of U. campestris japonica obtained from Späth stood in the Ryston Hall arboretum, Norfolk, in the early 20th century. The Arnold Arboretum specimens grew rapidly, and first flowered aged 12 years. A form from western China, for many years distinguished as U. wilsoniana Schneider, was introduced to the Arnold Arboretum in 1910. The Morton Arboretum, Illinois, has intermediate forms labelled U. japonica × U. wilsoniana. Unlike many Asiatic species, Japanese elm is tolerant of a mild, maritime climate with heavy winter rainfall and was consequently considered of potential use in the Dutch elm breeding programme led by H. M. Heybroek at the Dorschkamp Research Institute at Wageningen. In 1977, Heybroek collected the tree in Japan, with the result that there is now a small forest of Japanese elm in southern Flevoland, the largest plantation of the species beyond its native land.

The tree was briefly propagated and marketed in the UK by the Hillier & Sons nursery, Winchester, Hampshire from 1971 to 1977. Specimens planted at the Sir Harold Hillier Gardens have grown very well on heavy clay in an open location, where they support colonies of the White-letter Hairstreak Satyrium w-album. In trials elsewhere in Hampshire conducted by Butterfly Conservation, the tree also proved tolerant of dry soils on chalk and soils waterlogged in winter, although growth has been comparatively slow and leaves are late to flush, rarely before mid-May. 

Leaves from the tree were eaten during the Great Chinese Famine, but found to cause facial swelling.

Notable trees
In the UK, the TROBI Champion grows at the Royal Horticultural Society's Rosemoor garden in Devon, measuring 16 m tall in 2017. Another large tree grows at the Sir Harold Hillier Gardens, Romsey, measuring 13 m tall by 42 cm d.b.h. in 2003. A large specimen grows at Sussex University, Falmer, Brighton, but may be the cultivar 'Jacan'. The oldest putative specimen in Edinburgh, possibly one of those supplied as U. campestris japonica by Späth in 1903, had a bole-girth of about 3.5 m (felled 2018).

Cultivars
Japanese elm was assessed in Canada as a substitute for native elms which had succumbed to Dutch elm disease. Six particularly hardy cultivars were released there in the 1980s; three were also raised in the United States :  'Discovery', 'JFS-Bieberich' =  (formerly treated under U. propinqua Koidz.),
'Freedom', 'Jacan', 'Mitsui Centennial', 'Prospector' (formerly treated under Wilson's elm U. wilsoniana  C.K. Schneid.), 'Reseda', 'Thomson', Validation However, most of the Canadian clones have now been withdrawn from commerce owing to the Canadian government's restrictions on the movement of elm within the country, adopted to prevent the spread of Dutch elm disease.

Hybrids and hybrid cultivars
 Ulmus × mesocarpa, a natural hybrid of U. davidiana var. japonica and Ulmus macrocarpa was discovered in South Korea in the 1980s.

The Japanese elm was widely used in the US in hybridization experiments at the Morton Arboretum and University of Wisconsin, resulting in the release of the following cultivars: 'Cathedral', 'Morton' = , 'Morton Glossy' = , 'Morton Plainsman' = , 'Morton Red Tip' = , 'Morton Stalwart' = , 'New Horizon', 'Patriot', 'Rebona', 'Repura', 'Revera', and 'Sapporo Autumn Gold'.

The species has also been crossed with Dutch hybrids by the Istituto per la Protezione delle Piante (IPP) in Florence, Italy. Two clones, 'FL 610' and 'FL 626' were evaluated in England, by Butterfly Conservation.

Accessions
North America
Arnold Arboretum, US. Acc. nos. 4119 (from cult. material), 917-78, wild collected in Korea.
Brenton Arboretum, US. Listed as U. wilsoniana; no details available.
Brooklyn Botanic Garden , New York, US. Acc. no. 780251 (listed as U. japonica).
Chicago Botanic Garden, US. 1 tree in the West Collections Area, listed as U. propinqua var. suberosa.
Dawes Arboretum , US. 1 tree, no acc. details available.
Holden Arboretum, US. Acc. nos. 80-664 (unrecorded provenance), 97-126, wild collected in Korea.
Morton Arboretum, US. Acc. nos. 514-39, 679-62, 680-62, 354-U, 23-2008, 73-2011, also two others under the synonyms of U. propinqua Koidz. or cork bark elm (acc. no. 53-96), and U. propinqua Koidz. var. suberosa, collected from the Nei Mongol Zizhiqu Autonomous Region, China, (acc. no. 52-95).
U S National Arboretum, Washington, D.C., US. Acc. no. 68998. Also (listed under synonym U. japonica): 76253, 76254, 76227, and (listed under syn. U. propinqua): 76249, 68985, and (listed under U. propinqua var. suberosa): 76234, 76244, 76241.

Europe
Brighton & Hove City Council, UK. NCCPG Elm Collection.
Grange Farm Arboretum, Lincolnshire, UK. Listed as Ulmus japonica; acc. no. 514
Great Fontley, Fareham, UK, Butterfly Conservation Elm Trials plantation, planted 2002, grown from seed collected from the Great Elm, Hokkaido University, Sapporo, Japan.
Hortus Botanicus Nationalis, Salaspils, Latvia. Acc. nos. 18128,29,30,31.
Linnaean Gardens of Uppsala, Sweden, (as U. japonica). Acc. no. 1998-1284,  obtained from the Russian Federation, and 2001-1659, wild collected in South Korea.
Royal Botanic Garden Edinburgh, UK. Listed as U. japonica, acc. no. 19031053.
Royal Botanic Gardens, Kew, UK. Acc. nos. 1995-581, 1995-1305
Royal Horticultural Society Gardens, Wisley, UK. Listed as U. japonica, no details available.
Sir Harold Hillier Gardens, UK. Listed as U. japonica, acc. nos. 1977.5234, 1977.5972, 1977.6373, 1982.4019.
Tallinn Botanic Garden, Estonia. . Listed as U. japonica, no accession details available.
Thenford House arboretum, Oxfordshire, UK, no details available.
Wijdemeren City Council, Netherlands. Elm Arboretum, Brilhoek, Nederhorst den Berg, 2 planted in 2019 as U. propinqua.

Nurseries
North America
Patmore Nursery , Brandon, Manitoba, Canada
Sun Valley Garden Centre , Eden Prairie, Minnesota, US
Europe
Arboretum Waasland , Nieuwkerken-Waas, Belgium

References

External links
USDA Plant Guide: Ulmus davidiana
efloras.org: U. davidiana var. japonica (illustrations 1 to 9) 
  Sheet labelled U. davidiana Planch. var. japonica (Rehd.), Hokkaido specimen (new leaves and samarae), 1978
  Sheet described as U. campestris japonica, RBGE specimen from Späth nursery, 1903
 From Chanyang, W. China (Wilson specimen, 1909)
 From Hupeh, C. China (Wilson specimen, 1907)
 From Szechuan, C. China (Schneider specimen, 1914)

davidiana var. japonica
Trees of China
Flora of China
Trees of Japan
Flora of Japan
Trees of Korea
Flora of Korea
Trees of Asia
Ulmus articles with images
Elm species and varieties